Erysimum capitatum is a species of wallflower known commonly as the sanddune wallflower, western wallflower, or prairie rocket.

This species can be found in regions across North America, from the Great Lakes to the West Coast of the United States.  Some varieties have an extremely narrow distribution, especially those endemic to California.

Description
Erysimum capitatum is a mustard-like plant with thin, erect stems growing from a basal rosette and topped with dense bunches of variably colored flowers.  Flowers are most typically bright golden, yellow, or tangerine-colored, but plants in some populations may have red, white or purple flowers.   Each flower has four flat petals. Seed pods are nearly parallel to the stem. It is a biennial herb and its native habitats include plains, foothills, and high elevation coniferous forests. The Latin specific epithet capitatum refers to the head-like shape of the flower cluster or the knobby stigma.

Subspecies
There are varieties or subspecies of this plant. Some are listed endangered species. For example, Erysimum capitatum var. angustatum, the Contra Costa wallflower, is an endangered plant in the state of California.  The varieties include:

E. c. var. angustatum—Contra Costa wallflower; endemic to California, endangered species.
E. c. var. bealianum—Sanddune wallflower; Mojave Desert, California.
E. c. var. capitatum—Western wallflower; flowers from May to July, widely distributed across Colorado and Utah. 
E. c. var. lompocense—San Luis Obispo wallflower; endemic to California.
E. c. var. perenne (syn: Erysimum perenne)—Sanddune wallflower; endemic to California.
E. c. var. purshii—Pursh's wallflower; Western United States.

Pollinators
Little information on this wallflower species relationship with pollinators exists. Andrew Moldenke studied a population  of Erysimum capitatum var. perenne in Subalpine Talus Fell Scree of the Timberland Hall Area ( elevation). He observed 13 species of flower visitors, although over 80% of the visits to the flowers were performed by two ant species, Formica lasioides and one from the Formica fusca group.

Cultivation
Erysimum capitatum is cultivated as an ornamental plant. It is an attractive perennial, can be variable in appearance, and is used in butterfly gardening.

Uses
In Zuni ethnobotany, an infusion of the whole plant is used externally for muscle aches. The flower and the fruit are eaten as an emetic for stomach aches.

References

External links

USDA Plants Profile for Erysimum capitatum
Jepson Manual Treatment — Erysimum capitatum
Missouriplants.com: photos and species account
Erysimum capitatum Photo gallery

capitatum
Flora of the Northwestern United States
Flora of the Southwestern United States
Flora of the West Coast of the United States
Flora of the United States
Flora of the Great Lakes region (North America)
Flora of California
Flora of the California desert regions
Flora of the Sierra Nevada (United States)
Plants used in traditional Native American medicine